Graeme Wilson (born 15 December 1953) is a former Australian rules footballer who played with South Melbourne in the Victorian Football League (VFL).

Notes

External links 

Living people
1953 births
Australian rules footballers from Victoria (Australia)
Sydney Swans players
University Blues Football Club players